Lautaro Daniel Mesa (born 26 April 1997) is an Argentine professional footballer who plays as a forward.

Career
Mesa made his professional debut for Argentine Primera División side Argentinos Juniors on 22 August 2015, he was substituted on for the final five minutes in a 2–3 defeat to San Lorenzo at the Estadio Diego Armando Maradona. In February 2016, Mesa signed a new three-year contract with the club. He went onto make four appearances in the 2016–17 season as Argentinos won the Primera B Nacional title. On 20 August 2017, Mesa joined Brown of Primera B Nacional on loan. His first match for Brown was a loss against Guillermo Brown. Mesa scored his first goal on 30 April 2018 versus San Martín.

In January 2019, Mesa completed a move to Paraguay with División Intermedia side 3 de Febrero.

Career statistics
.

References

External links

1997 births
Living people
People from Ezeiza, Buenos Aires
Argentine footballers
Association football forwards
Argentine expatriate footballers
Expatriate footballers in Paraguay
Argentine expatriate sportspeople in Paraguay
Argentine Primera División players
Primera Nacional players
Argentinos Juniors footballers
Club Atlético Brown footballers
Club Atlético 3 de Febrero players
Sportspeople from Buenos Aires Province